Senator Wicks may refer to:

Arthur H. Wicks (1887–1985), New York State Senate
Charles W. Wicks (1862–1931), New York State Senate